The WCPW Bare Knuckles Championship (sometimes called the WCPW Brass Knuckles Championship) was a professional wrestling Hardcore Championship contested for in Windy City Pro Wrestling (WCPW). It was defended in the promotion from 1999 until 2008 when it was merged with the WCPW Heavyweight and League Championships to create a unified "WCPW World Heavyweight Championship".

The inaugural champion was Turbo, who won the title at the 11th annual Battle of the Belts supercard in Chicago, Illinois on May 22, 1999, to become the first WCPW Bare Knuckles Champion. Vito Fontaine, DOC, and Mike Anthony are tied for the record for most reigns, with two each. At 736 days, Fontaine's first reign is the longest in the title's history. Austin Roberts's only reign was the shortest in the history of the title. He defeated the last champion, Acid Jaz, on May 17, 2008, at Battle of the Belts 20 to unify the Bare Knuckles, Heavyweight and League titles. Overall, there have been 11 reigns shared between 14 wrestlers, with three vacancies, and 1 deactivation.

Title history
Key

Names

Reigns

Combined reigns

References

External links
WindyCityProWrestling.com

Bare Knuckles Championship
Hardcore wrestling championships